Anaida Stepanovna Sumbatyan (1905–1985) was an Armenian pianist.

She taught at the Central Moscow Conservatory. She became the first teacher who had two separate students win the International Tchaikovsky Competition: Vladimir Ashkenazy and Vladimir Krainev. Among her pupils were Vladimir Ashkenazy, Vladimir Krainev, Nelly Akopian-Tamarina, Sergey Musaelyan, Oxana Yablonskaya, Konstantin Orbelyan, Igor Bezrodny, Sergey Musaelyan, Dmitry Feofanov, Maxim Mogilevsky, Philip Koltsov, Elana Varvarova and others. Sumbatyan was friends with Sviatoslav Richter, Nina Dorliak, Heinrich Neuhaus, and Daniil Shafran.

Notes

References
Chopin Society of New York

External links
 Genealogy on Pianists Corner

Armenian classical pianists
Russian people of Armenian descent
Armenian pianists
Armenian women pianists
1905 births
1985 deaths
20th-century classical pianists
Women classical pianists
20th-century women pianists